Rosario de la Frontera is a department of the province of Salta (Argentina).

References 

Departments of Salta Province